Addie Camp, also known as Kennedyville, Addie Spur, or Canadaville (USGS maps only), is a ghost town located in Pennington County, South Dakota, United States. It was a mining camp in the Black Hills.

Naming
Addie Camp was named by the miners of the nearby Addie Mine. The later name "Kennedyville" came from the owner of the boarding house and saloon, Tom Kennedy. "Canadaville" is probably a corruption of "Kennedyville."

History
Addie Camp was settled by the miners of the nearby Addie Mine, which was run under the England-based Harvey Peak Tin Mining, Milling, and Manufacturing Company. The company mainly produced cassiterite from the Keystone-Hill City area. Another mine in the town, The Good Luck Mine, mined tungsten. In December 1892, the Grand Island & Wyoming Central Railroad built a line running from the town to the tin mill east of Hill City. The mine never became successful, despite shaft and drift mining down to 800 feet. On February 25, 1900, the railroad extended to Keystone, causing the town to grow again. The town included a boarding house, saloon, platform station, and commissary car for railroaders. The town declined when, in June 1917, the railroad leading into the town was removed. This turned Addie Camp into a small farming community.

Geography
The former site of the town is in Pennington County and is located 2.7 miles east of Hill City. The elevation is 4,892 feet (1,491 m) above sea level. There are only a few ruined houses remaining, which are located on the north side of the former railroad tracks and along an old gravel road.

References

Ghost towns in South Dakota
Former populated places in Pennington County, South Dakota